"No Ground No Fans" is a song by Wakes featuring British Internet celebrity The Wealdstone Raider (real name Gordon Hill). The song stems from a YouTube video of Hill taunting opposition fans at a Whitehawk F.C. v. Wealdstone F.C. football match in March 2013.

Baptiste Saunier remix 
French producer Baptiste Saunier remade Wakes' original track combining it with his alternative production style creating a more electronic based version, released 14 December 2014 the remix was titled "Wealdstone Raider - You Wansum"

References

External links 
 Full Lyrics at Genius.com

2014 singles